Marie Bouzková and Lucie Hradecká defeated Ons Jabeur and Ellen Perez in the final, 6–4, 2–6, [10–8], to win the doubles tennis title at the 2021 Birmingham Classic. This was Hradecká's 25th career WTA Tour doubles title and Bouzková's first career title overall.

Hsieh Su-wei and Barbora Strýcová were the defending champions from when the tournament was last held in 2019. After Strýcová retired from professional tennis in May 2021, Hsieh played alongside Elise Mertens but lost in the semifinals to Jabeur and Perez.

Seeds

Draw

Draw

References

External links 
 Main Draw
 
 WTA website

Birmingham Classicandnbsp;- Doubles
Doubles
2021 in English tennis